Luis Enrique Mena (born in Riosucio, Chocó on July 16, 1992) is a Colombian football midfield, who currently plays for Millonarios in the Categoría Primera A. Mena is a product of the Millonarios youth system and played with the Millonarios first team since April, 2008.

Statistics (Official games/Colombian Ligue and Colombian Cup)
(As of November 14, 2010)

References

External links
 Luis Enrique Mena at BDFA.com.ar 

1992 births
Living people
Colombian footballers
Millonarios F.C. players
Association football midfielders
Sportspeople from Chocó Department